Sevilla Fútbol Club is a Spanish professional football club based in Seville, the capital and largest city of the autonomous community of Andalusia, Spain. It plays in Spanish football's top flight, La Liga. Sevilla have won the UEFA Europa League six times, the most of any club. It is Spain's oldest sporting club solely devoted to football. The club was formed on 25 January 1890, with the Scottish born Edward Farquharson Johnston as their first president. On 14 October 1905, the club's articles of association were registered in the Civil Government of Seville under the presidency of the Jerez-born José Luis Gallegos Arnosa. Sevilla has a long-standing rivalry with cross-city rivals Real Betis.

Sevilla are also the most successful football club in Andalusia in terms of titles, with eighteen Andalusian Cups, one national league title in 1945–46, five Spanish Cup titles (1935, 1939, 1948, 2007 and 2010), one Spanish Super Cup (2007), a record six UEFA Cups/UEFA Europa Leagues (2006, 2007, 2014, 2015, 2016 and 2020) and one UEFA Super Cup (2006). They were also designated by the International Federation of Football History & Statistics as the World's best club in 2006 and 2007, thus being the first club to achieve this distinction in two consecutive years.

The youth team Sevilla Atlético, founded in 1958, currently play in Primera División RFEF. Other clubs related to Sevilla FC include their women's team. The rowing team that defends its crest in the yearly Sevilla-Betis boat race is not a section of the club but a call-up of registered-as-supporters professional rowers from the various rowing clubs of Seville.

The club's home ground is the 43,883-seat Ramón Sánchez Pizjuán Stadium. It is located in the neighborhood of Nervión, Seville, and is named after the late Ramón Sánchez Pizjuán, who was the president of Sevilla FC for a total of 17 years.

History

Foundation to Civil War 
The practice of football was introduced in Seville at the end of the 19th century by the large British expatriate population in the city, composed by owners or managers of manufacturing companies based in the capital of Andalusia. Sevilla Fútbol Club was founded on 25 January 1890 as Sevilla Foot-ball Club (in English).

Sevilla FC was duly formed on 25 January 1890 while a group of young British, mainly Scots, along with other young men of Spanish origin, celebrated Burns Night in Seville. The club's founding document, published on the Dundee Couriers edition of 17 March 1890 describes in full detail the formation of the club and how those young founding members decided first to play under Association Rules, secondly to bear the word "football" within its name and thirdly, to elect their "office-bearers". The following paragraph is an extract of that article:

The club's first president was the Scot Mr. Edward Farquharson Johnston (Elgin, 14 October 1854), who was the British vice-consul in Seville and co-proprietor of the firm MacAndrews & Co., ship-owners with commercial lines between Spain and the UK, one of them being the transport of Seville oranges. Hugh MacColl, another Scottish young man (Glasgow, 9 June 1861), a marine engineer who at that time had moved to Seville to work as the technical manager of Portilla White foundry, was their first captain. One of Maccoll's partners in the Portilla White foundry in Seville, Isaias White junior, was the club's first secretary. He was the son of an English entrepreneur who founded the aforesaid company, one of the major foundries in Spain at the end of the 19th century.

In order to celebrate the foundation of the club, Isaias White sent a letter to Huelva Recreation Club, to invite them to play a football match in Seville. That letter was published by the Spanish newspaper La Provincia. The Huelva club accepted the invitation and the match took place on 8 March 1890, being thus the first official match ever played in Spain. Sevilla FC won that historical match 2–0, with the first goal in an official match in Spanish football history scored by the Seville team player Ritson. Isaias lived at Calle Bailen 41 in Seville (the house still exists but has since been renumbered) making this the first home of Sevilla FC.

In 1907, Sevilla Balompíe was founded, followed by Betis Football Club in 1909, Recreativo de Sevilla and Español de Sevilla. More clubs were formed as the years passed and more competitive matches were organized between the teams, although Sevilla FC, the oldest club of the city, imposed its supremacy over the other clubs in this early period. 

In 1912, the first Copa de Sevilla was played and won by Sevilla FC. From 1915 to 1940, the Campeonato Regional Sur (also known as the Copa Andalucía) was organized by the "Federación Sur" (Andalusian FA) and these championships included Sevilla FC, Real Betis Balompié, Recreativo de Huelva, Español de Cádiz and the sporadic participation of other clubs such as Nacional de Sevilla and Córdoba. The domination of Sevilla was so evident that of the 20 championships played, 17 were won by Sevilla FC, (the three remaining being won by Español de de Cádiz, Recreativo de Huelva and Real Betis Balompié).

In 1917, Sevilla FC participated in the "Copa de España" for the first time and became the first Andalusian team to reach the final round of the competition. In 1928, when the "Campeonato Nacional de Liga" (National League Championships) was organized, Sevilla FC was not part of the First Division due to their defeat to Racing de Santander in an elimination game that was set-up to decide which of the two teams would compete in the newly formed league.

At the end of the 1933–34 season, Sevilla FC was promoted to the First Division of the "Campeonato Nacional de Liga." In 1935, they were proclaimed "Campeón de Copa" (Cup Champions) for the first time by defeating Sabadell, repeated in 1939 against Racing de Ferrol and again in 1948 against Celta de Vigo. The club participated in two other finals, but conceded defeat to Athletic Bilbao in 1955 and to Real Madrid in 1962. Sevilla FC remained in the First Division from the 1933–34 season until 1968, when they were relegated to the Second Division, a tier from which they have never further been relegated from.

The 1945–46 season was one of high importance in the history of Sevilla, as it marked the first, and to date only, time in which Sevilla FC were League champions. On four other occasions, the club was proclaimed "subcampeón de Liga" (League Runner-up: 1939–40, 1942–43, 1950–51 and 1956–57).

Including the 2021–22 season, Sevilla has participated 78 times in the First Division and 13 in the Second Division, never dropping below the Second Division. Sevilla has also participated in four European tournaments, the "Copa de Europa" (European League Winners Cup) (1957–58); Recopa (Winners Cup) (1962–63) and UEFA Cup on nine occasions (1966–67, 1970–71, 1982–83, 1983–84, 1990–91, 1995–96, 2004–05, 2005–06 and 2006–07). Sevilla also participated in the UEFA Champions League in 2007–08.

There are more than 400 individuals who currently play for the Sevilla FC organization, which includes two semi-professional teams (in Second Division A – second national category) and 12 youth teams.

Sevilla has always counted on having international players within its ranks to aid in the pursuit of trophies. The first of these players were Spencer and Herminio in the 1920s. Juan Arza, an international player from the 1940s, was proclaimed top scorer of the Spanish League in the 1954–55 season, with 29 goals. About 30 Sevilla players have been chosen to play for the Spain national football team over the years.

Foreign players have always played an integral part in the success of Sevilla FC with Diego Maradona representing the most well known among them during his spell with the club during the 1992–93 season. During the same season, Sevilla FC was managed by Carlos Salvador Bilardo, a world champion manager.

Historically, Sevilla FC has fielded teams in a variety of other sports including: basketball, rugby, rowing, athletics, and weightlifting or petanca. Presently, Sevilla FC counts twenty-five professional teams on its ledgers (one of these being in the second national category) and a women's football team in the Honor Division.

Sevilla FC's stadium, the Ramón Sánchez Pizjuán, was inaugurated in 1958 and is one of the largest stadiums in Spain, and has the honor of hosting a World Cup semi-final match in 1982. After its final completion, the stadium had a maximum capacity of 75,000 spectators, but since its latest remodelling, the stadium has been converted to an all-seat with a covering added to the main seating area, reducing the capacity to its current count of 45,000 spectators.

 First successes 

Sevilla had their first spell of national success in the decade following the end of the Civil War, winning the 1945–46 La Liga title and two Copa del Rey titles. In the first season of this (1939–40), Sevilla won the cup on 25 June, beating Racing de Ferrol 6–2 in Barcelona. That same season, the side lost the Liga title on the last day to Atlético Madrid after drawing 3–3 against Hércules. The Sevilla forward line was known as los stukas after the German bomber aircraft, and scored 216 goals over four seasons. It comprised López, Torrontegui, Campanal, Raimundo, Berrocal and Pepillo.

In 1941, President Ramón Sánchez Pizjuán left the club to manage the Spanish Football Federation. After his departure, Antonio Sánchez Ramos occupied temporarily occupied the position until the permanent appointment of Jerónimo Domínguez y Pérez de Vargas, Marquess of Contadero, who was president of the club for six years until the return of Sánchez Pizjuán. Sevilla was runner-up to Athletic Bilbao in the 1942–43 season and came third a season later. Sevilla won its only Liga title in 1945–46, edging FC Barcelona by one point. Two years later, Sevilla won the 1948 Copa del Rey after beating Celta de Vigo 4–1 in Madrid on 4 July.

The most significant signing of those years was the Spanish international striker Juan Arza. There was also the debut of the Campanal's nephew, defender Campanal II, with his uncle as a trainer. During the 1950–51 season, with Campanal acting as the coach, the team finished runner-up in La Liga, two points behind Atlético Madrid. Before the 1953–54 season, Argentinean coach Helenio Herrera was hired. During his time in charge, the club came fifth in the 1953–54 season, fourth in both 1954–55 and 1955–56 and second to Real Madrid in 1956–57. 

In 1954, the club put the construction of the new stadium out to tender because Nervión Stadium was becoming too small for the club's fanbase. In the 1954–55 season, Arza won the Pichichi Trophy as La Liga's top scorer, with 28 goals, and the team was runner-up in the Copa del Rey. In 1955, for the club's 50th anniversary, a triangular tournament was organized against the French club Stade de Reims and the Swedish club IFK Norrköping; Sevilla won.

On 28 October 1956, President Sánchez Pizjuán suddenly died. As an appreciation to the deceased leader under whose chairmanship Sevilla had won three Copas del Rey, the fans decided that the club's planned new stadium was to be named in his honour. In the 1956–57 season, the team were Liga runners-up behind Real Madrid, ensuring qualification for the first time to the European Cup. Herrera left the club at the end of the season. The club needed a victory on the final day of the next season to avoid relegation but reached the quarterfinals of the European Cup before being knocked out by holders and eventual champions Real Madrid.

After the death of the President, Ramón de Carranza assumed the position for four years. It is said that he spoke these words at Sánchez Pizjuán's tomb:

"Dear Ramón, now your friends, among who I am honored to be one, is going to give you Christian burial, and on the following day, giving your body to the ground, we will start working and your dream that the Sevilla FC has a grand stadium will become a reality. Ramón, go in peace to heaven because your wishes will be fulfilled."

Being true to his words, Carranza made obligation bonds amounting to 50 million pesetas, and a month and a half after Sánchez Pizjuán's death, the first stone in the stadium's construction was placed. The architect was Manuel Muñoz Monasterio, co-designer of the recently built Santiago Bernabéu Stadium, the home of Real Madrid. The Ramón Sánchez Pizjuán Stadium was ultimately opened on 7 September 1958 as Sevilla played an inaugural friendly against fellow Andalusian club Real Jaén. The stadium's first official match was on the opening day of the 1958–59 season, where Sevilla beat cross-city Real Betis 4–2.

 Crisis and stability 

In the 1970s, Sevilla was forced into selling its top players in order to pay off debts incurred from the construction of its new stadium; Manuel Ruiz Sosa transferred to Atlético Madrid, Gallego to Barcelona and Juan Batista Agüero to Real Madrid. Moreover, part of the adjacent land to the stadium was also sold to a bank. In the 1967–68 season, Sevilla returned to the Second Division for the first time in 31 years but was promoted back after one season. The next season, Austrian coach Max Merkel, nicknamed "Mr. Whip" for his usage of severe and harsh discipline techniques and training, was hired. 

That season, the club finished third in the league. However, the club was relegated again at the end of the 1972–73 season. In 1973, Sevilla signed their first-ever black player, Gambian winger Biri Biri, from the Danish club Boldklubben 1901. He remained at the club until 1978 and became a cult figure, with an ultra group named after him surviving to this day. In the 1974–75 season, with the Argentine Roque Olsen in charge, the club returned to the First Division. In the late 1970s, Sevilla signed Argentinians such as Héctor Scotta and Daniel Bertoni.

Directed first by Miguel Muñoz and later by Manolo Cardo, the team participated in two consecutive seasons of the UEFA Cup from 1981 to 1983. The 75th anniversary of the club was celebrated with a variety of social events and a match against the Brazilian side Santos. In 1982, the World Cup was held in Spain and Sevilla's Ramón Sánchez Pizjuán was the venue for the semi-final match between West Germany and France. In 1984, Eugenio Montes Cabeza finished his 11-year presidency and was replaced by the cattle businessman Gabriel Rojas, who as the vice-president had made several advancements to the club's stadium. In the 1985–86 season, Manolo Cardo left his management position after five years in charge, while Francisco played in the 1986 FIFA World Cup for Spain. Vicente Cantatore led the club to UEFA Cup qualification at the end of the 1989–90 season, with Austrian forward Toni Polster scoring a club-record 33 Liga goals. 

In the 1992–93 season, after several months of negotiations, world-renowned Argentine Diego Maradona signed from Napoli for a fee of $7.5 million. His time at the club, however, was unsuccessful, and he was released in large part due to his periodic injuries and clashes with coach Bilardo. In the following seasons, Luis Aragonés became manager and finished the 1994–95 season with qualification to next season's UEFA Cup.

At the end of the 1994–95 season, despite the pleas of the club's directors, Sevilla, along with Celta de Vigo, were one of two clubs relegated from the top flight on reasons of administration, provoking action from fans. The action resulted in both Sevilla and Celta being reinstated to La Liga.

These events led to an institutional instability, with the season seeing four presidents and three managers take charge. Sevilla was relegated at the end of the 1996–97 season but returned in 1999. At the beginning of the 21st century, the presidency of the club was assumed by the popular Roberto Alés. The situation of the club was very delicate at the time; the team had dropped back to the Second Division in 2000 and the squad was weakened by player retirements and the sales of key players. The club opted for a relatively unknown trainer, Joaquín Caparrós, who helped the team win the Second Division with three matches to spare in just his first season at the helm.

 Successes in the 21st century 
In May 2002, Roberto Alés resigned as president, and the Sevillian lawyer José María del Nido assumed the presidency. One of his first decisions was to confirm Caparrós as a coach and Monchi as sporting director.

On 6 October 2002, before a Seville derby against Betis at the Sánchez Pizjuán, four Sevilla fans, including a minor, assaulted a security guard. The attack was punished by Sevilla being forced to play their next four home matches behind closed doors, the longest term ever given to a La Liga side. The club finished sixth in the 2003–04 La Liga, giving the club qualification for the 2004–05 UEFA Cup and marking a return to continental competition for the first time since the 1995–96 season. In the 2004–05 league season, Sevilla finished sixth and qualified for the following season's UEFA Cup, entering the competition in the third qualifying round.

This set up Sevilla's first-ever European triumph in the 2006 UEFA Cup Final at the Philips Stadion in Eindhoven on 10 May 2006. The club defeated English club Middlesbrough 4–0 under new manager Juande Ramos, with the scoring opened by Brazilian striker Luís Fabiano. In the second-half, Italian substitute Enzo Maresca scored twice to be named Man of the Match, and Malian striker Frédéric Kanouté finished the scoring, to give the club its first major title in 58 years on the season of its centenary, which was celebrated in October 2005.

Sevilla opened their 2006–07 season by winning the 2006 UEFA Super Cup on 25 August 2006 with a 3–0 victory over Champions League winners and compatriots Barcelona at the Stade Louis II in Monaco. The goals were scored by Renato, Kanouté and a late penalty by Maresca. The season ended with a second consecutive UEFA Cup win, this time against fellow Spanish club Espanyol at Hampden Park, Glasgow. The match went to penalties after finishing 2–2 after extra-time, with Sevilla goalkeeper Andrés Palop saving three of Espanyol's penalties.

On 12 November 2006, Sevilla played its 2,000th game in La Liga. Sevilla defeated Getafe in the 2007 Copa del Rey Final, with Kanouté scoring the only goal in the game's 11th minute. Sevilla finished third in that season's La Liga to qualify for the 2007–08 Champions League, returning to the competition for the first time in 50 years. As a result of these successes, Sevilla was voted as the IFFHS Team of the Year for the second consecutive season, becoming the first club to achieve this.

Sevilla won the 2007 Supercopa de España against La Liga champions Real Madrid. The season started to derail, however, after defender Antonio Puerta suffered a heart attack in the first game of the season and died three days later on 28 August. Three days after his death, Sevilla then lost 3–1 to Milan in the 2007 UEFA Super Cup in Monaco. Juande Ramos, the individual largely responsible for Sevilla's recent successes, resigned as manager on 27 October to take the post with Tottenham Hotspur; he was replaced by Sevilla Atlético manager Manolo Jiménez. In spite of the personnel issues, Sevilla nonetheless advanced in first place in its Champions League group ahead of Arsenal before later being eliminated in the round of 16 via penalties to Fenerbahçe of Turkey.

In the summer of 2008, before Jiménez's debut season as first-team manager, Dani Alves and Seydou Keita were both sold to Barcelona, while Christian Poulsen left for Juventus. Sevilla finished third in La Liga with a club record-equalling 21 victories and a club record number of away victories.

The 2009–10 season saw a third-consecutive qualification to the Champions League. On 19 May 2010, Sevilla defeated Atlético Madrid 2–0 in the 2010 Copa del Rey Final at Camp Nou, with goals from Diego Capel and Jesús Navas. Before the 2010–11 season started, Sevilla lost to Barcelona 5–3 on aggregate in the Supercopa and were eliminated in the Champions League playoffs by Portuguese club Braga.

 Unai Emery era 

On 14 January of the following year, after a 0–2 away loss to Valencia that left the Andalusians in 12th place, Jiménez was relieved of his duties, and was replaced by Spanish manager Unai Emery. The club went through an organizational financial crisis and was forced to sell team stars Álvaro Negredo and Jesús Navas, transactions that gave the club a combined €40 million; the duo was replaced by a contingent of younger players including strikers Carlos Bacca and Kevin Gameiro.

On 14 May 2014, Sevilla defeated Benfica on penalties in the 2014 UEFA Europa League Final to claim their third triumph in the competition. After this season key midfielder Ivan Rakitić was sold to Barcelona for around €16 million (the deal was closed on 16 June 2014). In summer 2015 top scorer Carlos Bacca, who had only joined two years previous, moved to Milan for €30 million. Despite these exits, the club acquired players Grzegorz Krychowiak and Éver Banega to reinforce the squad.

On 27 May 2015, Sevilla repeated as Europa League champions after defeating Ukrainian club Dnipro Dnipropetrovsk 3–2 in the 2015 Final. The goals for Sevilla were scored by Grzegorz Krychowiak and a brace from Carlos Bacca. By defeating Dnipro, they became the only club to have won the Europa League four times.

The club returned to the Europa League final for a third consecutive time, facing Liverpool in the 2016 Final. After being down 1–0 at half-time, Sevilla bounced back in the second half to eventually win 1–3, with one goal scored from Kevin Gameiro and two from club captain Coke. With its third consecutive Europa League title, Sevilla improved its record of most Europa League titles won, having lifted the trophy five times in the span of ten years.

 Post-Emery era 

Despite Sevilla's continued success in the Europa League, the 2015–16 season proved to be another finish outside the top four, the side finishing in seventh. In response, Castro decided to engineer a resurrection of the club. Jorge Sampaoli was hired as manager – replacing Paris Saint-Germain-bound Unai Emery – and the club began to invest heavily that summer. Additions to the side included goalkeeper Salvatore Sirigu on loan, playmaker Ganso, forwards Luciano Vietto and Wissam Ben Yedder, attacker Franco Vázquez, wide midfielders Hiroshi Kiyotake and Pablo Sarabia, as well as former Arsenal and Manchester City player Samir Nasri on loan. 

In December of the 2017–18 La Liga, Vincenzo Montella was named as the third manager since Emery's departure in 2016 replacing Eduardo Berizzo. In the 2017–18 UEFA Champions League season, Sevilla progressed into the knockout stages of the competition, and defeated Manchester United in the Round of 16, reaching the quarter-finals of the competition for the first time in 60 years, though they ultimately lost to Bayern Munich 2–1 on aggregate in the quarter-finals.

On 4 June 2019, Sevilla announced the signing of Julen Lopetegui as manager for the next three seasons. On 16 August 2020, Sevilla won 2–1 over Manchester United in the semi-finals of the 2019–20 UEFA Europa League, en route to lifting the trophy for a record sixth time, beating Inter Milan 3–2 in the final. Sevilla are currently the most successful club in the UEFA Europa League competition, having won the competition six times, more than any other team.

 Board and finances 

 Presidency 
Sevilla is governed by a presidential management system, but with a board of directors that discusses and approves those important decisions that must be carried out. The president is supported by a general director sometimes and a sports director.

Throughout its history, Sevilla has had 28 presidents, the first being Edward Farquharson Johnston, a Scotsman. Those who have occupied the presidency for the longest periods have been Ramón Sánchez Pizjuán, Eugenio Montes Cabezas, José María del Nido Benavente, Luis Cuervas Vilches and José Castro Carmona.

In 1992, Sevilla FC became a Sporting Limited Association, following the entry into force of the law that regulated this kind of sporting companies, and therefore the system of election of the president was amended from being elected by the members to be elected by the shareholders of the club.

 Ownership 
 Sevillistas de Nervion S.A. (José María del Nido, Roberto Alés, José Castro, José Martín Baena, Francisco Guijarro, and José Gómez Miñán)
 Rafael Carrión Moreno 
 
 Accionistas Unidos (Supporters' Trust / Minor shareholders)

 Symbols 

 Anthems 

Sevilla has two official anthems:
 Official Anthem of Sevilla FC: This anthem dates back to the year 1983. The lyrics were written by Ángel Luis Osquiguilea de Roncales and the music was composed by Manuel Osquiguilea de Roncales.
 Centennial Anthem of Sevilla FC: Composed in 2005 by singer Javier Labandón 'El Arrebato' to commemorate the centenary of the registration of the club's articles of association, it became Spain's number one single and the best-selling anthem of a football club in the entire history of Spanish football, reaching the 2nd position of the best-selling albums in 2006. On 9 October 2006, in the Estadio Ramón Sánchez-Pizjuán, 'El Arrebato' was awarded the golden record his anthem.

 Crest 
From its foundation, the team used a double-circled crest. On the exterior circle, the name of the club and the date of its foundation were written, while in the interior circle on a white background the letters "SFC" were interlaced as they are on the current crest. This first crest was designed by Juan Lafita, who was a close associate of the club and was the son of the Sevillian painter José Lafita y Blanco.

The second crest was designed in 1922 by Pablo Rodríguez Blanco, a draftsman of the Water Company. He divided the shield in three parts and together they formed the silhouette of a heart. The three figures that appear are the Christian saints portrayed on the coat of arms of the city—Isidore of Seville, Ferdinand III of Castile and Leander of Seville. On the right side appear the initials "SFC," which were on the official shield from 1905 to 1922. 

Where the three parts meet, a football of the era appears. Regarding the red and white stripes, there are various theories, but it seems that the most coherent is that from the first time, the club wished that the official kit would be red and white. Another version indicates that the lower part is inspired on the flag which King Ferdinand III of Castile carried in the reconquest of Seville in 1248.

 Flag 
The definition of Sevilla's flag is in the articles of association of 1982, which is a modification of the old ones which were formed and deposited in the Record of Associations and Sports Federations of the Higher Council of Sports. Its title 1, article 6 states that this is a distinctive emblem of the club:

The flag, which will be rectangular, divided by a diagonal line that goes from the lower left angle to the upper right angle, which divides it into two triangles, the superior is white and the inferior red.

 Kit 
Sevilla wore shirts with a sponsor logo for the first time in the 1986–87 season, to promote the Seville Expo '92. Previously, before the 1980–81 season, the club signed its first kit-manufacturer deal with the German firm Adidas. Since 2022 the kit is manufactured by Castore.

 Media 

Sevilla have several media outlets. Its radio station, SFC Radio, launched in September 2004, broadcasts all day on FM and online, while its television channel SFC TV aired for the first time in the 2005–06 season with a UEFA Cup match against Zenit Saint Petersburg. Since 8 June 2009, the television coverage has been shown on the club website. Sevilla issue a physical and digital newspaper the day after every match and on the same day as an important one, as well as a magazine before home games. The official magazine of the club is released every two months, the first issue being free and issued at a friendly against the Brazil national team to mark the club's centennial in September 2005.

 Players 

 Current squad 

 Reserve squad 

 Out on loan 

Current technical staff

 Former coaches 
see also 

 Facilities 

 Stadium 

In their first fifty years Sevilla played their home matches in various locations around Seville: la Trinidad Field, the Mercantile Field, 'La Victoria' Stadium and the Estadio de Nervión.

The Ramón Sánchez Pizjuán Stadium was first planned in 1937 when the land was bought near to the then-home of Sevilla, in Nervión, and construction began in 1954. A contest was held for its design, won by the architect Manuel Muñoz Monasterio, who had also designed the home of Real Madrid, the Santiago Bernabéu Stadium.

The construction of the stadium was completed in the summer of 1958 and was inaugurated on 7 September of the same year with a friendly match against Real Jaén. The east and west grandstands to the stadium were finished in 1974 under the presidency of Eugenio Montes Cabezas and increased the stadium's capacity to 70,000. The visor, the mosaic on the main façade (by Santiago del Campo) and the new lighting were added for the 1982 FIFA World Cup, in which it held a group game between the Soviet Union and Brazil, as well as a semi-final between France and West Germany. 

The 1986 European Cup Final was held in the stadium, and won by Steaua București against Barcelona. The capacity of the stadium was reduced to approximately 60,000. The last modification was made during the mid-1990s, when according to FIFA rules, all standing areas were redeveloped into seating, reducing the capacity to the present 42,714.

The Spain national team have played 26 matches in the stadium since 1961, unbeaten with 21 wins and 5 draws. To mark the club's centenary in 2005, an allegorical mosaic designed by Ben Yessef was built above the southern gate, depicting the history of the city of Seville. Above it, the club's badge floated in the wind. The stadium currently houses the headquarters of the club's media, as well as an official store, club museum and trophy cabinet.

 Training facilities 
The sporting facilities known as La Ciudad Deportiva (The Sporting City) are used by the first team for training and by the reserve teams and women for matches. These facilities were inaugurated in 1974 and are located on the outskirts of the city on the road to Utrera. It has four natural grass pitches and three artificial pitches, as well as an artificial pitch for the Antonio Puerta Football School, changing rooms, gymnasium, press room, cafeteria, medical center and a recovering room.

 League record 
 Season to season 79 seasons in La Liga13 seasons in Segunda División

Since the club was first promoted to La Liga in the 1934–35 season, Sevilla has played all but thirteen seasons in the first division. Sevilla won La Liga in the 1945–46 season, and finished as runners-up four times (1939–40, 1942–43, 1950–51 and 1956–57). While the club has only suffered four short-lived descents to the Segunda División, it won the second division title in 1968–69 and 2000–01.

 European competition record 

 1 Group stage. Highest-ranked eliminated team in case of qualification, lowest-ranked qualified team in case of elimination.

UEFA club coefficient ranking

 Honours 

Throughout its history, Sevilla has won trophies at the regional, national and European level – including a record six UEFA Cups/UEFA Europa Leagues — and is the most successful club in Andalusia. In 2010 Sevilla was given permanent possession of the Copa del Rey after their victory in the competition to celebrate Spain winning the 2010 FIFA World Cup.

League
 La Liga Winners (1): 1945–46
 Segunda División Winners (4): 1929, 1933–34, 1968–69, 2000–01

Cups
 Copa del Rey  Winners (5): 1935, 1939, 1947–48, 2006–07, 2009–10
 Supercopa de España:
 Winners (1): 2007

European
 UEFA Europa League Winners (6) – record: 2005–06, 2006–07, 2013–14, 2014–15, 2015–16, 2019–20
 UEFA Super Cup Winners (1): 2006

 Regional tournaments 
 Campeonato Regional Sur Winners (17): 1916–17, 1918–19, 1919–20, 1920–21, 1921–22, 1922–23, 1923–24, 1924–25, 1925–26, 1926–27, 1928–29, 1929–30, 1930–31, 1931–32, 1935–36, 1938–39, 1939–40

 Friendly tournaments 
 Antonio Puerta Trophy Winners (9): 2008, 2009, 2011, 2012, 2013, 2014, 2017, 2019, 2022

 Ramón de Carranza Trophy Winners (6): 1955, 1956, 1957, 2004, 2008, 2009

 Costa del Sol Trophy Winners (2): 1964, 2004

 Achille & Cesare Bortolotti Trophy Winners (1): 2010
 Ciudad de la Línea Trophy Winners (3): 2001, 2002, 2003
 Teresa Herrera Trophy Winners (4): 1946, 1954, 1960, 2011
 Colombino Trophy Winners (4): 1975, 1985, 1996, 2005
 City of Seville Trophy Winners (7): 1972, 1973, 1976, 1978, 1982, 1984, 1994
 Russian Railways Cup Winners (1): 2008
 Trofeo de la Sal Winners (1): 2010
 Antonio Camacho Memorial Winners (1): 2012
 Costa Brava Trophy Winners (1): 2012
 Supercopa Euroamericana Winners (1): 2016

 Other awards, records, and recognitions 
 Medal of Andalusia (2005), issued by the Junta de Andalucía.
 Best team of the world in 2006 and 2007 according to the International Federation of Football History & Statistics (IFFHS).
 Best team as voted by the Federation of Sports Journalists of Andalucía (2006).
 Prize for the best team of 2006 according to the Spanish Sports Press Association.
 In January 2007, Sevilla were awarded with the 15th Communication Award granted by the Seville Press Association.
 Royal Order of Sports Merit, granted by the Superior Council of Sports.
 Gold medal of the Royal Chamber of Commerce for economic-administrative management.
 The only team to win the UEFA Europa League three times in a row: 2013–14, 2014–15, 2015–16

 Individual trophies 
 Pichichi Trophy (1):
 Juan Arza (1955)
 Zarra Trophy (2):
  Álvaro Negredo (2011), (2013)
 Zamora Trophy (1):
  Yassine Bounou (2022)

 Team records 
 As of 2020–21 season.

 General information 

Most goals scored in a league match

 Most goals conceded in a league match 

 Statistics in UEFA competitions 

The debut of Sevilla in European competitions took place in the 1957–58 season as a participant in that season's European Cup. Despite finishing runner-up in the league to Real Madrid, Sevilla represented Spain in the competition as Real had already qualified by winning the European Cup the season before.

Accurate as of 9 March 2023Pld = Matches played; W = Won; D = Drawn; L = Lost; GF = Goals for; GA = Goals against; GD = Goal difference

 Player records Top scorers in the history of the club up to February 2023(*) 43 goals of the Campeonato Regional Sur are not counted as it is not considered an official tournament.Most official appearances up to February 2023'

Affiliated teams 

Sevilla's B team, Sevilla Atlético, was founded in 1958 and currently plays in Segunda, the second tier of Spanish football. Graduates from it to Sevilla's first team include Sergio Ramos and Jesús Navas, members of the Spain squad which won the 2010 World Cup and UEFA Euro 2012. Sevilla FC C, founded in 2003, compete in the fourth tier of Spanish football, the Tercera División, having risen with four consecutive promotions from provincial and regional leagues.

Sevilla's women's team play in the top-flight of Spanish women's football, the Super Liga, and currently play their home games at the club's training ground, Ciudad Deportiva José Ramón Cisneros Palacios. Sevilla acquired the women's club from CD Hispalis in 2004, and the club had its greatest success in the 2005–06 season, when it came runner-up in the Super Liga and the national cup.

Since its foundation for the 2007–08 season, the Spanish indoor football league has included a Sevilla veterans' team. Sevilla FC Puerto Rico, of Juncos, is a Puerto Rican football club of the Puerto Rico Soccer League. The side affiliated to Sevilla in 2008, and share a similar badge and kit. Since 2008, Sevilla has been one of two Spanish clubs (the other being Atlético Madrid, to compete in Superleague Formula, in which cars endorsed by professional football clubs compete in races across the world.

The Sevilla-Betis regatta is an annual rowing competition in Seville's Guadalquivir river, held since 1960. Different categories of boats represent Sevilla and its cross-city rival Real Betis. Sevilla have won on 30 of the 47 regattas.

Seville has strategic partnership with Indian 3rd Division Club FC Bengaluru United

Support

Fans 
In 2007, Sevilla was the eighth-most supported club in Spain with 2.3% of the nation's football fans (compared to 32.8% for the most popular, Real Madrid). Their city rivals Real Betis possess 3.3% of the nation's support.

Since Sevilla became Sporting Limited Association, the concept of membership disappeared. Only the shareholders can take part in the decisions of the club according to the percentage of the capital they hold. The minority shareholders of the club are organised in a federation that represents them in the General Meeting of Shareholders that the club celebrates every year.

People who are traditionally referred to as members are currently fans who purchase a yearly season ticket which allows them to attend all home matches that season. Sometimes these members enjoy some specific advantages over the rest of the fans.

Fan clubs 
Sevilla's fan clubs are mainly concentrated in the city of Seville, its province and the rest of Andalusia. The presence of fan clubs in other autonomous communities is greater in Catalonia and Extremadura. Most of them are integrated into the "San Fernando Fan Clubs Federation" (Federación de Peñas Sevillistas "San Fernando"), which, according to its statutes, is totally independent from the directive board of the club, having its own board and not being intervened.

Ultras 

The Biris Norte is an organized group of ultra supporters located in the North grandstand of the Ramón Sánchez Pizjuán. The group's name comes from the Gambian player Alhaji Momodo Njie, nicknamed Biri Biri, who became very popular amongst the Sevilla fans in the 1970s. The "Biris Norte" was created in the 1974–75 and is one of the oldest groups of Ultra fans in Spain.

Rivalries 

Sevilla compete in the Seville derby against their cross-city rivals Real Betis. The two played each other for the first time on 8 October 1915 in a match which was won 4–3 by Sevilla. The game is considered one of the most important derbies in Spanish football. Sevilla also has a significant rivalry with Atlético Madrid and Valencia CF.

References

External links 

  
 Sevilla FC at La Liga 
 Sevilla FC at UEFA 
 Ramon Sanchez-Pizjuan Stadium Guide

 
Sport in Seville
La Liga clubs
Football clubs in Andalusia
Copa del Rey winners
History of Seville
Association football clubs established in 1905
1905 establishments in Spain
UEFA Europa League winning clubs
UEFA Super Cup winning clubs
Segunda División clubs
UEFA Cup winning clubs
Multi-sport clubs in Spain